Komsomolsky (Komsomoľsköj) is an urban locality (an urban-type settlement) under the administrative jurisdiction of the town of republic significance of Vorkuta in the Komi Republic, Russia. As of the 2010 Census, its population was 1,047.

Administrative and municipal status
Within the framework of administrative divisions, the urban-type settlement of Komsomolsky, together with two other urban-type settlements (Mulda and Zapolyarny), is incorporated as Komsomolsky Urban-Type Settlement Administrative Territory, which is subordinated to the town of republic significance of Vorkuta. Within the framework of municipal divisions, Komsomolsky is a part of Vorkuta Urban Okrug.

References

Notes

Sources

Urban-type settlements in the Komi Republic
